Cello Concerto No. 2 in A major, G. 475 is a cello concerto by Luigi Boccherini. It has been arranged and reorchestrated several times. Ottorino Respighi reorchestrated the Concerto, and changed the "Tutti" sections; adding winds and brass. Gaspar Cassadó rewrote the Concerto altogether as a Guitar Concerto for his colleague Andrés Segovia. Cassadó's arrangement features a string quartet, like a Concerto Grosso, and added trumpet fanfares.

Arrangements

Sergey Aslamazyan – Moskva : Muzyka
Michel Brusselmans – Éditions Salabert
Samuel Dushkin – Mainz, B. Schott's Söhne (Violin)
Gaspar Cassadó – Mainz, B. Schott's Söhne (Guitar)
Ottorino Respighi – Milan : Ricordi

Boccherini 02
Compositions by Luigi Boccherini
Compositions in A major